The Game Awards 2022 was an award show that honored the best video games of 2022. The event was hosted by Geoff Keighley, creator and producer of The Game Awards, and was held to an invited audience at the Microsoft Theater in Los Angeles on December 8, 2022. The preshow ceremony was hosted by Sydnee Goodman. The event was live streamed across more than 40 digital platforms, alongside an additional IMAX experience. It featured musical performances from Halsey, Hozier, and Bear McCreary, and presentations from celebrity guests, including Reggie Fils-Aimé, Al Pacino, Pedro Pascal, Bella Ramsey, and Ken and Roberta Williams. The show introduced a new Best Adaptation award for media adapted from video games.

God of War Ragnarök led the show with eleven nominations and six awards; it won Best Narrative and Best Action/Adventure Game, while its lead actor Christopher Judge won Best Performance for his role as Kratos and its composer McCreary won Best Score and Music. Elden Ring won Game of the Year, as well as Best Game Direction and Best Role Playing Game. Several new games were announced during the show, including Crash Team Rumble, Death Stranding 2, Hades II, and Judas, and the first full clip for The Super Mario Bros. Movie was shown. The show received media attention after an individual sneaked on stage and made a short speech towards the event's end. The show was viewed by over 103 million streams, the most in the show's history. Reviews for the ceremony were mixed, with praise for announcements and speeches but criticism directed at the focus on marketing over awards and lack of indie game representation.

Background 

As with previous iterations of The Game Awards, the 2022 show was hosted and produced by Canadian games journalist Geoff Keighley. He returned as an executive producer alongside Kimmie Kim, and Richard Preuss and LeRoy Bennett returned as director and creative director, respectively. Sydnee Goodman returned as host of the 30-minute preshow, rebranded as the Opening Act. The presentation took place at the Microsoft Theater in Los Angeles on December 8, 2022, and was live streamed across more than 40 online platforms and social media services, including Facebook, TikTok, Twitch, Twitter, and YouTube, as well as introducing Instagram Live worldwide and partnering with Tiki in India. For the first time since 2019 due to the COVID-19 pandemic, the show opened its attendance to the public, allowing around 1,000 attendants, though overall attendance was limited to a couple thousand to avoid further restrictions. Kim expected more international guests, particularly from Japan, due to the ease of travel restrictions. Public tickets became available for purchase on November 1, though the show remained subject to change pending health and safety guidelines changes due to COVID-19 in California.

Keighley wanted the show to be more cinematic, opting for a shorter duration than previous years—around 2.5 hours—in response to viewer feedback; he felt viewers encountered fatigue with previous shows and worked to streamline by cutting some content. Keighley struggled with the balance between awards and announcements, noting that industry members largely value the former whereas about 75 percent of the community prefer the latter. The show partnered with IMAX to create The Game Awards: The IMAX Experience, a live community event allowing participation worldwide and featuring an exclusive gameplay sequence of the upcoming game Dead Space; it was broadcast in 40 locations in the United States and Canada, where tickets became available on November 16. During the show, Valve gave away one Steam Deck each minute to eligible viewers on Steam in Canada, the European Union, United Kingdom, and United States. Eligible Twitch viewers received rewards allowing them to redeem Rogue Legacy on the Epic Games Store, and in-game items such as a Keighley mask in Among Us, Twitch emote skins in Cult of the Lamb, and Kait Diaz costume in Fall Guys.

The Game Awards 2022 was the third show to feature Future Class, a list of 50 individuals from across the video game industry who best represent its future; the initiative was led by its director Emily Bouchoc and internal communications manager Jessie Kuse. More than 2,500 Future Class nominations were accepted in September and October and the list was announced on December 5, featuring individuals like BURA co-founder Camila Gormaz, The Game Bakers co-founder Audrey Leprince, and Global Game Jam president Dr. JC Lau. The 2022 show added an award for Best Adaptation, recognizing media adapted from video games, including films, television shows, novels, comic books, and podcasts. Keighley felt the popularization of adaptations led to them passing the minimum threshold of nominees and it was time to honor them. The Game Awards partnered with Discord to present Best Community Support and introduce voting and guest events in the show's Discord server.

Announcements 

Keighley estimated the show involved over 50 games, about 30 to 40 of which are announced games showing new content. The first clip of The Super Mario Bros. Movie was revealed during the show. Announcements on released and upcoming games were made for:

 Among Us
 Baldur's Gate III
 Blood Bowl 3
 Blue Protocol
 Call of Duty: Modern Warfare II
 Colossal Cave 3D Adventure
 Company of Heroes 3
 Cyberpunk 2077
 Dead Cells
 Destiny 2: Lightfall
 Diablo IV
 Dune: Awakening
 Final Fantasy XVI
 Fire Emblem Engage
 Forspoken
 Genshin Impact
 Horizon Call of the Mountain
 Horizon Forbidden West
 Meet Your Maker
 Nightingale
 Party Animals
 Replaced
 Returnal
 Rocket League
 Sky: Children of the Light
 Star Wars Jedi: Survivor
 Street Fighter 6
 Suicide Squad: Kill the Justice League
 Tekken 8
 The Last of Us Part I
 The Lords of the Fallen
 Vampire Survivors
 Viewfinder
 Warhammer 40,000: Space Marine 2
 Wild Hearts

New games announced included:

 After Us
 Armored Core VI: Fires of Rubicon
 Banishers: Ghosts of New Eden
 Bayonetta Origins: Cereza and the Lost Demon
 Behemoth VR
 Crash Team Rumble
 Crime Boss: Rockay City
 Death Stranding 2
 Earthblade
 Hades II
 Hellboy: Web of Wyrd
 Immortals of Aveum
 Judas
 Post Trauma
 Remnant 2
 Transformers Reactivate
 Valiant Hearts: Coming Home
 Wayfinder

Several fans and journalists expressed frustration by the lack of Xbox announcements during the event; IGNs Ryan McCaffrey called it "a slap in the face to players". Some theorized the company's absence may be due to the Federal Trade Commission announcing it would attempt to block Microsoft's acquisition of Activision Blizzard in the morning of the show, though journalists noted it was likely unrelated. Aaron Greenberg, vice president of Xbox Games Marketing, responded to the complaints by stating the company had announcements planned for 2023.

Stage interruption 

After Elden Ring was announced as the Game of the Year winner, an individual followed the developers on stage and waited while they gave their speech. As music began to play after director Hidetaka Miyazaki's speech, the individual approached the microphone and said "I want to thank everybody and say I think I want to nominate  this award to my Reformed Orthodox  rabbi Bill Clinton " in a thick Israeli accent. During the 13-second speech, The Washington Post observed Keighley waving for security; security escorted the individual off stage and Keighley ended the show as planned. Minutes later, Keighley said the individual had been arrested; the Los Angeles Police Department later said no arrest was made but the individual had been detained and questioned at the venue by on-site police and security before being transported to a local police station. The event received immediate attention by news outlets and on social media; a model of Clinton was modded into Elden Ring. Several journalists criticized the ambush and noted it presented potential danger to the Elden Ring developers and overshadowed their award. The Game Awards blurred the individual's face when sharing an image of Miyazaki's speech on Twitter after the event.

Subsequent reports identified the individual as a 15-year-old who had premeditated the stunt with his friends. Reports emerged that he had a history of publicly expressing support for the 2019–2020 Hong Kong protests at NBA matches and BlizzCon in 2019 and had appeared twice on InfoWars, an American far-right talk show, whose host Owen Shroyer described him as "one of the young stars of the conservative movement". He spoke without an accent during these appearances. The individual's InfoWars appearance and choice of shoewear during the ceremony—Adidas Yeezy by Kanye West, who had recently made multiple antisemitic public statements—led to speculation that his Game Awards interruption was "feeding into" antisemitic tropes. In subsequent media interviews, the individual refused to break character but claimed to be Jewish, said to have recently attained an Israeli accent, denied being a fan of InfoWars, and disagreed with West's political views. He claimed his statement "wasn't intended to be a dog whistle for far-right conspiracies". Journalists described him as a "troll", "prankster", and "shitposter"; Bloomberg Newss Jason Schreier said the individual was "almost certainly a Jewish prankster" based on his understanding of Hebrew. Digital Trendss Giovanni Colantonio found the moment a poetic representation of the show itself: "a fan overshadowing the people who we were supposed to be celebrating". According to the Los Angeles Times, future Game Awards events will increase security as a result of the incident.

Winners and nominees 

Nominees were announced on November 14, 2022. Any game released for public consumption on or before November 18, 2022, was eligible for consideration. The nominees were compiled by a jury panel composed of members from over 100 media outlets globally, including specialized juries for accessibility, adaptation, and esports awards: 117 media outlets for general nominees, 18 jury members for accessibility, and 16 outlets for esports. Winners were determined between the jury (90 percent) and public voting (10 percent); the latter was held via the official website and Discord server until December 7. According to Keighley, public voting within the first 24 hours increased 42 percent compared to The Game Awards 2021; within the first week, 35 million votes had been submitted, more than double in the same period the previous year and exceeding 2021's total three-week count. When the polls closed, more than 55 million votes had been submitted, an increase of 138 percent over 2021. Keighley felt the competition was particularly rife between the two "flagship games", Elden Ring and God of War Ragnarök. Christopher Judge's Best Performance acceptance speech ran for 7 minutes and 59 seconds, exceeding the longest Oscar speech (set in 1943 by Greer Garson) by two-and-a-half minutes.

The exception to the jury-voted awards is Players' Voice, fully nominated and voted-on by the public; the winner was determined after three rounds of voting, which ran from November 28 to December 7. The final two rounds of Players' Voice voting led to accusations of bribery and bots, as some users suspected Genshin Impact players were voting in hopes of receiving in-game currency and erroneously suggested the game had offered some to players who voted for it, while some Genshin Impact players accused Sonic Frontiers fans of using bots to vote. Several journalists reported a lack of credible evidence of bots or bribery, and Keighley felt bots were uninvolved but said his team would investigate. Discourse surrounding the voting became adversarial, with fandoms attacking each other and the subreddit r/SonicTheHedgehog restricting posts about the award. Some users reported the website only allowed them to vote for either Genshin Impact or Sonic Frontiers. Keighley jokingly referenced bot accusations when crowning Genshin Impact the winner during the show. PC Gamers Mollie Taylor noticed adversarial discourse remained on both sides after the event. Genshin Impact distributed in-game currency to all players after its win. Keighley said the discourse reaffirmed the show's decision to avoid fully-public voting for main categories.

Awards 
Winners are listed first, highlighted in boldface, and indicated with a double dagger.

Video games and media

Esports and creators

Games with multiple nominations and awards

Multiple nominations 
God of War Ragnarök led the show with eleven nominations, tied for the most in the show's history. It was followed by Elden Ring with eight, and Horizon Forbidden West and Stray with seven. Sony Interactive Entertainment led the publishers with 21 nominations, followed by Annapurna Interactive with 12, and Nintendo with 11. In addition to video game publishers, Netflix received three nominations for its television productions in Best Adaptation.

Multiple awards 
God of War Ragnarök led the show with six wins, followed by Elden Ring with four, and Final Fantasy XIV and Stray with two each. Sony Interactive won a total of seven awards, followed by Bandai Namco Entertainment and Nintendo with four each.

Presenters and performers

Presenters 

The following individuals, listed in order of appearance, presented awards or introduced trailers. All other awards were presented by Keighley or Goodman.

Performers 

The following individuals or groups performed musical numbers.

Ratings and reception

Nominees 
Several journalists and viewers were surprised to see Xenoblade Chronicles 3 nominated for several awards—particularly Game of the Year—due to previous snubs of the Japanese role-playing game genre; GamesRadar+s Jordan Gerblick called it the show's dark horse nomination. Elden Rings Best Narrative nomination received mixed responses, with some praising the subtle storytelling and others noting the game lacked a good or proper narrative; The A.V. Clubs William Hughes felt nominating Elden Ring alongside the traditional storytelling of God of War Ragnarök and untraditional Immortality was "just begging for the whole exercise to fall apart". Several journalists considered Sifus Best Fighting Game nomination inappropriate as it is an action game. 4Playerss Jonas Hoeger criticized Best Mobile Game nominees Diablo Immortal, Genshin Impact, and Tower of Fantasy due to their manipulative microtransactions systems, and Best Multiplayer Game nominee Overwatch 2 for its problematic early access launch. He felt Best Family Game had become outweighed by Nintendo games and its title was not representative of its nominees, some of which are single-player games.

Destructoids Eric Van Allen praised the nominations of Citizen Sleeper and Vampire Survivors. PC Gamers Andy Chalk felt Immortality was overlooked for Best Independent Game, and the Best Sim/Strategy Game category may need reworking due to the "weird" grouping of games like Mario + Rabbids Sparks of Hope, Two Point Campus, and Victoria 3. TheGamers Eric Switzer named Ghostwire: Tokyo, Hardspace: Shipbreaker, and Sonic Frontiers the biggest snubs and wrote the eligibility period led to games like Pentiment and Somerville—which released after the nominees were announced but before the cutoff date—being overlooked. VentureBeats Mike Minotti thought Final Fantasy XIV: Endwalkers soundtrack was snubbed—likely due to its release in December 2021—and hoped Live a Live had received more nominations. Game Rants Aidan Connor felt new categories for roguelike and horror games were necessary to allow recognition for overlooked indie titles like Rogue Legacy 2 and Signalis, respectively. Kotakus Sisi Jiang found the Games for Impact category insulting, both for assuming AAA games are not impactful and acting as a "consolation award" for indie games.

Den of Geeks John Saavedra felt the Game of the Year nominations of A Plague Tale: Requiem and Stray represented a shift in the industry toward smaller games, supported by It Takes Twos win in 2021. Inverses Willa Rowe opined the line had blurred between independent and "AA" games, and "indie game" had become more of a stylistic term than a measurable trait, citing small-budget independent games like Citizen Sleeper and I Was a Teenage Exocolonist being overlooked due to the popularity and higher budgets of indie publishers like Annapurna Interactive and Devolver Digital. TheGamers Stacey Henley similarly considered Strays nominations unbalanced due to its marketing push by Sony, and felt it exposed a flaw in the hierarchy of categories: its Game of the Year nomination signified it would win the less-prestigious Best Indie Game, which in itself meant it would win Best Debut Indie Game. TheGamers Sean Murray considered A Plague Tale: Requiems Game of the Year nomination surprising, calling the game "a compelling sequel" that was brought down by underutilized gameplay mechanics and a poor final act. Similarly, although she enjoyed the game, VentureBeats Rachel Kaser found Strays nomination misplaced and thought Tunic would have been more appropriate.

Ceremony 

Todd Martens of the Los Angeles Times criticized the show's return to "a vacuum of marketing" with little reference to ongoing events, unlike Keighley's statement the previous year denouncing workplace harassment. He enjoyed some of the moments that "cut through the noise", like Ken and Roberta Williams presenting Games for Impact and As Dusk Fallss director Caroline Marchal's subsequent winning speech. Digital Trendss Colantonio similarly considered the lack of focus on awards disappointing, and noticed the teleprompter asking winners to conclude their speeches almost instantaneously. He cited a particularly disheartening moment in which Keighley announced winners of several important categories in rapid succession and "in an instant and just as quickly" aired a trailer for Call of Duty: Modern Warfare II. Nintendo Lifes Zion Grassl felt the winners were rushed off stage too quickly. Varietys Kaare Eriksen identified the show's increasing codependence with Hollywood despite its attempts to highlight the artistic validity of the medium, citing Al Pacino's appearance, the announcement of Idris Elba in Cyberpunk 2077, and the introduction of Best Adaptation won by Netflix.

The Washington Posts Shannon Liao reported the in-person audience was "visibly bored and some look sleepy" in the show's final hour. VentureBeats Kaser called the event satisfying but predictable, praising Pacino's appearance and Animal's banter with Bear McCreary. The Guardians Lewis Gordon and Keza MacDonald felt, like previous years, the ceremony continued to focus too heavily on announcements over awards—20 of the 32 winners were crowned between announcements and without acceptance speeches. MacDonald wrote the show lacked a specific focus between awards and announcements, which she felt "sit uneasily together". Gordon found some skits unenjoyable and trailers excessive, and favored the unscripted moments for avoiding the show's otherwise commercial nature, citing Christopher Judge's lengthy acceptance speech; Kotakus Claire Jackson similarly felt Judge "stole" the show, and VentureBeats Dean Takahashi described it as "a beautiful moment". Takahashi wrote the show "had something for everyone" and considered Hades II and Judas the biggest surprises. 

Destructoids Noelle Warner, who attended the show as a seat filler, found the impressive production value enhanced the atmosphere of announcements and performances, though noted the event ran longer than planned. Video Games Chronicles Nathan Brown was shocked by his enjoyment of the show, citing the announcements, performances, and winners, though was disappointed by the focus on marketing over awards and the lack of attention towards indie games; he recommended that future ceremonies drop Best Independent Game and expand other categories to better represent independent developers. TechRadars Cat Bussell lauded the fresh and unique quality of the games announced at the show but found the winners remained constrained by traditionalism despite their caliber. Push Squares Sammy Barker thought the show reached its full potential, praising the pacing, running time, reveals, and balance between announcements and awards, though questioned the necessity of categories like esports awards when they continue to receive little fanfare. Similarly, Dot Esportss Cale Michael felt esports categories were continually overlooked, noting the winners were announced within 72 seconds during the preshow whereas Judge's speech ran for around eight minutes.

Prior to the show, Kotakus Alyssa Mercante highlighted the poor fashion of previous Game Awards ceremonies as demonstrative of the industry's lack of representation. The discourse garnered responses from Nintendo of America president Doug Bowser and Microsoft executive Phil Spencer, and Mercante and other journalists recognized it led to an improvement in fashion at the 2022 show; attendees receiving particular praise included Aurora, Fuslie, Hideo Kojima, and Valkyrae. Musician Pedro Eustache, dubbed "Flute Guy", received media attention for his enthusiastic flute performance and ability to swap between instruments during the orchestra's Game of the Year medley; Eustache, who has performed with The Game Awards Orchestra since 2017, thanked the audience for their response and apologized for not using the shinobue during Xenoblade Chronicles 3s section of the medley.

Viewership 

An estimated 103 million viewers watched the ceremony, the most in the show's history and a 20 percent increase from the previous year. Over 11.5 million total views were recorded on Twitter, which saw a 28 percent increase of tweets and a 31 percent increase of the hashtag #TheGameAwards. It topped the trends for the ninth year in a row, with 16 of the top 30 trends related to the show, including the top five. Over 9.5 million total viewers watched on Steam, with a peak of 850,000 concurrent views. On Twitch, the show peaked at 1.9 million concurrent viewers—an increase of 20 percent—with 571,000 on the show's official channel. On YouTube, it set a show record with a peak of 1.33 million concurrent viewers, a 37 percent increase, with 604,000 on the official channel. It was the most-discussed Game Awards ceremony to date on social media, with 308,000 mentions on the day of the event, an increase of almost 180 percent; Judge's extensive speech garnered 12,600 mentions, the stage interruption accounted for 10,100, while the top three games mentioned were Elden Ring (57,300), God of War Ragnarök (31,000), and Hades II (20,600). Keighley had previously felt the 2022 show would be the first to shrink in overall viewership after eight years of successive growth, partly due to the easing of the COVID-19 pandemic and the gradual waning interest in live streams.

Notes

References

External links 
 

The Game Awards ceremonies
2022 awards in the United States
2022 in video gaming
2022 video game awards
December 2022 events in the United States